Rosa Mistica is a 1988 Filipino romantic fantasy anthology film directed by Emmanuel H. Borlaza and written by Orlando B. Nadres. Based on the Pilipino Klasiks comic by Pablo S. Gomez, the film is composed of three segments, with Snooky Serna starring in the lead role in each segment. Produced by Regal Films, it was released on March 3, 1988, and was a commercial success.

Critic Luciano E. Soriano of the Manila Standard gave the film a positive review, and considered the final segment to be the film's highlight.

Plot

Mga Puting Rosas ni Rosalie
Rosalie Leynes, a young woman from a rich family, is engaged to Mike, but on their wedding day, Rosalie dies and goes to heaven. She implores a woman who looks similar to the Virgin Mary to return her to Earth in order to settle some unfinished business, which the woman grants. Three years after her death, Rosalie returns to find Mike about to poison her sickly mother Donya Natalia in order to inherit her wealth and support his parents.

Mga Pulang Rosas ni Rosanna
Rosanna Cabuyao is the poor daughter of the caretaker of the Villafuerte family's mausoleum. One day, the body of Ramil, the last remaining member of the Villafuertes, is brought to a cemetery. Rosanna had a crush on Ramil before his apparent death, and is compelled to open his coffin, only to find Ramil alive and well. Ramil reveals to her that he is a vampire, and was once the love of Rosanna in a past life during the Spanish colonial period, only to be cursed by Lucila. Eventually, Ramil convinces Rosanna's family to come live in his mansion.

Mga Dilaw Na Rosas ni Rosario
Rosario Karakol is an unattractive but loyal maid at the house of Nyora Diday. While cleaning the attic, Rosario stumbles upon a magic mirror that has the power to make her beautiful. Upon the death of Nyora Diday, Rosario is named as her heiress, but both Donya Loleng and her daughter Trixia are unwilling to accept this fact and refuse to leave the house. Trixia also plans to keep Dio, Rosario's crush, away from her.

Cast

Release
A pictorial (photoshoot) for Rosa Mistica was held in mid-February 1988. The film was released on March 3, 1988, and was a box office success.

Critical response
Luciano E. Soriano, writing for the Manila Standard, gave Rosa Mistica a positive review, and considered its final segment "Mga Dilaw Na Rosas" to be the "most entertaining" of the three. He praised Serna's against-type comedic performance as Rosario in the said segment, stating that "she makes Rosario funny, pitiful and lovable." Soriano questioned, however, a few decisions the filmmakers took in telling the stories, such as the first segment's three-year gap between Rosalie's death and return and the casting of Aga Muhlach as the opportunistic Mike, as well as the second segment's use of vampires, which is "alien" to Filipino folklore.

References

External links

1988 films
1980s romantic fantasy films
Filipino-language films
Films about reincarnation
Films about the afterlife
Films about wish fulfillment
Maids in films
Philippine anthology films
Vampires in film